The 1938–39 Boston Bruins season was the Bruins' 15th season in the NHL, and they were coming off of a very successful regular season in 1937–38, winning the American Division with a record of 30–11–7, however, they lost to the Toronto Maple Leafs in the Stanley Cup semi-finals. This season, the Bruins would meet the Maple Leafs in a rematch, and win the series 4–1 to win the Stanley Cup for the second time, and the first time in 10 years.

Regular season
In the off-season, the NHL would lose a franchise, as the Montreal Maroons would fold, leaving the league with seven teams, and eliminating the American and Canadian Division format the league had been using since 1926.  The Bruins would make a key acquisition, acquiring Roy Conacher from the Kirkland Lake Hargreaves of the NOHA.

Boston would see goaltender Tiny Thompson get injured during an early season game, forcing the club to sign Frank Brimsek, who played for the Providence Reds of the IAHL.  Brimsek stepped in and played great hockey, and when Thompson came back from his injury, the Bruins decided to deal him to the Detroit Red Wings for Norm Smith.  Brimsek would help lead the Bruins to 1st place in the NHL standings, as they finished the season with a record of 36–10–2, earning 74 points, their highest point total since the 1929–30 season.

Bill Cowley would lead the team with 42 points, despite missing 14 games due to injuries.  His 34 assists were a league high.  Rookie Roy Conacher scored an NHL high 26 goals, and added 11 assists to finish with 37 points.  Milt Schmidt continued to show improvement, scoring a career high 32 points.  Flash Hollett led the Bruins defense with 27 points, as he scored 10 goals and added 17 assists, while Dit Clapper scored 13 goals and 26 points from the blueline.

In goal, rookie Frank Brimsek led the NHL with 33 wins and a 1.56 GAA, earning both the Vezina Trophy and the Calder Memorial Trophy.  He also recorded 10 shutouts, which was among the league leaders.

Final standings

Record vs. opponents

Schedule and results

Playoffs
In the playoffs, Boston would have a 1st round bye, advancing straight to the NHL semi-finals, where they would face the 2nd place New York Rangers in a best of 7 series.  New York had 58 points during the regular season, which was 16 less than the Bruins.  The series opened at Madison Square Garden in New York, and the Bruins would win a thrilling, triple overtime game by a score of 2–1.  Game 2 moved to the Boston Garden, and Boston took a 2–0 series lead with a 3–2 overtime victory.  The Bruins took a commanding 3–0 lead in the series with a 4–1 win, looking to close out the series in the 4th game, as the series shifted back to New York.  The Rangers would hold off elimination, defeating Boston 2–1, and then in game 5 in Boston, the game would be decided in overtime, with New York once again winning by a 2–1 score to cut the series lead to 3–2.  Game 6 was played back in New York, and the Rangers easily defeated the Bruins 3–1, to tie the series up at 3 games, forcing a 7th game to be played in Boston.  The game would be tied 1–1 after regulation time, and would not be settled until the 3rd overtime period, when Boston finally snapped the tie, winning the game 2–1, and taking the series 4–3, to advance to the Stanley Cup finals.

The Bruins opponent was the Toronto Maple Leafs, who finished the season with a 19–20–9 record, earning 47 points, which was 27 points fewer than Boston.  The Leafs defeated the New York Americans and Detroit Red Wings to earn a spot in the best of seven finals.  The series would begin with 2 games in Boston, and each team won a game, as the series moved to Maple Leaf Gardens for games three and four.  Boston would take control in Toronto, winning game three by a 3–1 score, then shutting out the Leafs 2–0 in game four, to take a 3–1 series lead.  Boston then returned home for game five, and defeated Toronto 3–1, to win their first Stanley Cup in 10 years, and second in team history.

Boston Bruins 4, New York Rangers 3

Boston Bruins 4, Toronto Maple Leafs 1

Player statistics

Regular season
Scoring

Goaltending

Playoffs
Scoring

Goaltending

See also
 1938–39 NHL season

References

National Hockey League Guide & Record Book 2007

External links
SHRP Sports
The Internet Hockey Database

Stanley Cup championship seasons
Boston Bruins seasons
Boston
Boston
Boston Bruins
Boston Bruins
1930s in Boston